Lakshmi Bomb is a 2017 Indian Telugu-language revenge-drama film starring Lakshmi Manchu.

Cast 

Lakshmi Manchu as Judge Lakshmi and Priya (Double role)
Prabhakar as Vaikuntam
Posani Krishna Murali as Lakshmi and Priya's father
Hema as Lakshmi and Priya's mother
Bharath Reddy as Rahul
 Jeeva as Lawyer
 Amit Tiwari
 Hemanth
 Rakesh
 Subbaraya Sharma
 JVR
 Raja Babu
 Sarath
 Sri Harsha
 Vishal

Production 
The film was shot in the United States.

Soundtrack 
The film's music was composed by Sunil Kashyap. The audio release function took place on 17 January.

Release 
The Times of India gave the film one out of five stars and wrote that "The script lacks any coherence with what the screenplay". 123 Telugu wrote "On the whole, Lakshmi Bomb is a below average revenge drama which gets messed up by some lack-lusture narration in the second half."

References 

2017 films
2010s Telugu-language films
Indian films about revenge